Dördyol may refer to:
Birinci Dördyol, Azerbaijan 
İkinci Dördyol, Azerbaijan